Bryan Gilbert Powley (16 September 1871 – 18 December 1962) was a British stage and film actor.  He began his career in the era of silent film.

Life
Powley was born on 16 September 1871 in Reading, the son of the Rev. Matthew Powley and Louisa Jane Tinker.  His father was at that time Vicar of Whitley, Reading, but had formerly been Chaplain to the British Community in Málaga and a Canon in Gibraltar.   

On 7 September 1904, Powley married Evelyn Mary Foster at All Saints Church, Hampstead.  Evelyn Mary Foster was the daughter of Joseph Foster, the eminent genealogist.  On 19 May 1905, Bryan Powley and Evelyn Foster had a daughter, Esmay Margaret Powley.  

Powley was the uncle of Bruce Belfrage and Cedric Belfrage.  He died in Worthing, Sussex, on 18 December 1962.

Selected filmography
 The Harbour Lights (1914)
 Fancy Dress (1919)
 The Nonentity (1921)
 The Old Curiosity Shop (1921)
 Open Country (1922)
 The Glorious Adventure (1922)
 Wee MacGregor's Sweetheart (1922)
 The Poisoned Diamond (1933)
 Cross Currents (1935)
 Moonlight Sonata (1937)
 Love from a Stranger (1937)
 Strange Boarders (1938)
 Old Mother Riley Joins Up (1940)

References

External links
 

1871 births
1962 deaths
English male stage actors
English male film actors
English male silent film actors
People from Reading, Berkshire
19th-century English male actors
20th-century English male actors